Several ships have been named  :

 , a Tachibana-class destroyer of the Imperial Japanese Navy during World War II
 JDS Kusu (PF-281), the lead ship of her class of the Japan Maritime Self-Defense Force, formerly USS Ogden (PF-39)
 Kusu-class patrol frigate, a class of destroyer of the Japan Maritime Self-Defense Force, formerly USS Tacoma-class frigate

See also 
 Kusu (disambiguation)
 Kusunoki (disambiguation)

Imperial Japanese Navy ship names
Japanese Navy ship names